La Puebla de Montalbán is a Spanish town and municipality in the province of Toledo, in the autonomous community of Castile-La Mancha. It is located in a plain of the River Tajo.

Government
The mayor of La Puebla de Montalbán is Juan José García Rodríguez, of the ruling Partido Socialista Obrero Español. The Partido Socialista Obrero has six municipal councillors in the town's ayuntamiento, the Partido Popular has six and an independent group has one. 
In the 2004 Spanish General Election, the Partido Popular got 53.4% of the vote in La Puebla de Montalbán, the Partido Socialista Obrero Español got 48.6% and Izquierda Unida got 1.6%.

Notable citizens

 Fernando de Rojas (c. 1465/73 - 1541), author of Comedia de Calisto y Melibea, usually called La Celestina.
 Francisco Hernández de Toledo (ca. 1514-1517 - 1578), botanist and King Philip II's doctor.
 Pedro Pacheco de Villena (died 1560), Bishop of Siguenza, Cardinal Bishop of Albano, participant in the Council of Trent. 
 Andrés Pacheco (1550 - 1626), Franciscan and Roman Catholic Cardinal 
 Luis Carrillo de Toledo (1564 - 1626), general and statesman.
 Enrique Dávila Pacheco (15?? - 1663), an administrator in certain Spanish new world colonies.
 Ángel Luis Ruiz Paz (born 1987), footballer
 Álvaro Rico (born 1996), actor

References

External links
 Aerial view of La Puebla de Montalbán, Spain (From "Google maps")

Puebla